King's Highway 410, also known as Highway 410 and colloquially as the four-ten, is a 400-series highway in the Canadian province of Ontario that connects Highways 401 and 403 to Brampton. North of Brampton, the freeway connects to Highway 10, which continues north through Caledon as a four-lane undivided highway.

Highway 410 was built along the alignment of Heart Lake Road south of Bovaird Drive, while north of Bovaird Drive it was built along a new alignment. The highway was designated in 1978 between Highway 401 and Bovaird Drive (later Highway 7), though it was only two lanes wide and had at-grade intersections. It was widened throughout the 1980s and completed as a freeway in 1991. In 2003, construction began on a northward extension of the freeway that was completed in November 2009.

Route description 
Highway 410 is a commuter freeway acting as the southward continuation of Highway 10, which formerly ran alongside the 410 and continued south through Brampton and Mississauga prior to the two highways being connected in 2009.

Highway 410 starts at a massive stack interchange with Highway 401 and Highway 403. Highway 403's eastern segment which runs from the south and west through central Mississauga splits up into a collector-express system at Eglinton Avenue, and while the express lanes continue directly to Highway 401 express lanes east of the 401-403-410 interchange, just north of the Matheson Boulevard overpasses the collector lanes effectively continue northward as Highway 410 after exit/entry ramps linking to Highway 401 collector lanes.

Maintaining a straight north-westward course, it passes beneath Courtney Park Drive and Derry Road, with a slight jog to the right between the two underpasses. The freeway then meets Highway 407 at a cloverstack interchange as it crosses into Brampton and passes beneath a hydro corridor. Veering to the left, the freeway continues through industrialized areas and returns to its northwest–southeast orientation. It passes beneath Steeles Avenue East, following alongside the alignment of Heart Lake Road (now mostly broken up into segments), and later Queen Street East, the former Highway 7, now Peel Regional Road 107. Until it was decommissioned across the Greater Toronto Area, Highway 7 was concurrent between Queen Street East and Bovaird Drive. Passing north of Queen Street, the highway leaves the industrial area and passes through residential areas in an open cut until Bovaird Drive East.

The more recently completed extension begins at this point, as the highway returns to ground level and passes to the west of Trinity Common and departs from the Heart Lake Road alignment passing near the Heart Lake Conservation Area.
As it passes beneath Mayfield Road, the highway makes a sharp turn to the west and descends through the Etobicoke Creek valley.
After rising back to level ground, it curves north, passing beneath Valleywood Drive. The central concrete median and high-mast lighting end as the freeway becomes Highway 10, which continues north to Orangeville, Shelburne and eventually Owen Sound.

History 

Planning for highway 410 began during the late 1960s as a result of the rapid suburbanization of Brampton. On May 25, 1965, the Department of Highways (DHO) unveiled the Toronto Region Western Section Highway Planning Study. The plan designated several new highway corridors and widening projects through Peel and Halton, including Highway 10.
However, it did not include a truck bypass that was desired by Brampton city council. In 1969, William H. Brydon would encourage the DHO to construct this bypass utilizing Heart Lake Road through the city, and announced the plans at his final city council meeting as mayor, claiming that it may be known as the Brampton Expressway and would connect with Highway 401.
Successor Jim Archdekin announced in the new year that he would meet with highways minister George Gomme to discuss the route of the bypass.
The DHO studied the corridor over the next several months before releasing a report in late August.

Ontario Premier Bill Davis, who was known as "Brampton Billy", formally initiated the construction of Highway 410 along the Heart Lake Road corridor during his administration.
Prior to the construction of Highway 410, Heart Lake Road was flanked by the industrial lands of Brampton and Bramalea north of Steeles Avenue, which required the highway to follow the road's alignment to avoid demolition of buildings. Between Steeles and Highway 401 was agricultural lands, allowing for the highway to constructed on a separate alignment to the west. In 1975, construction began on the widening of Highway 401 between Highway 10 (Hurontario Street) and Highway 427. During this expansion from four to six lanes, directional ramps were constructed with the new road to allow access to and from Toronto.
Heart Lake Road though Brampton was rebuilt over the next several years, and reopened as a two lane expressway on November 15, 1978. It was at this point that the road was designated Highway 410 as far north as Queen Street.

The construction of Highway 410 resulted in changes to the surrounding street network: The intact southern section of Heart Lake Road south of Steeles Avenue was severed from the northern section after the highway largely subsumed the latter. This portion was renamed Tomken Road (as a continuation of a street linked to its southern terminus when a jog was eliminated), and a diversion was constructed by the City of Brampton to connect it with Steeles further east. The West Drive Extension, between Orenda Road and Steeles, was constructed in 1983 to link with the north end of the new diversion.

Construction to twin the highway began in 1983, following the completion of a culvert over the east branch of the Etobicoke Creek;
the interchange with Clark Boulevard was built at the same time.
The following year, contracts were awarded to build the two structures over the Canadian National Railway south of Orenda Road,
as well as an interchange at Queen Street; the former was completed by the end of the year while the latter took until late 1985. Construction of the interchange at Bovaird Drive began in 1985 and was completed the following summer.
With the construction of each interchange, the future northbound lanes of the freeway were constructed and opened to two-way traffic. By 1988, two lanes were open between Steeles Avenue and Bovaird Drive.

In 1987, construction began south of the future Highway 407 interchange, expanding the two lane Heart Lake Road to a six lane freeway. In addition, work began on the future southbound lanes north of Steeles Avenue.
In 1990, work began on an interchange with Courtney Park Drive.
By mid-1991, Highway 410 was complete from north of Highway 401 to Bovaird Drive, and work was underway to complete the junction, with a flyover ramp from Highway 401 eastbound to Highway 410 northbound, while the flyover ramp from Highway 410 southbound to Highway 401 eastbound replaced the existing loop ramp.
The interchange with Highway 401 was expanded alongside the widening of that highway to a collector-express system and opened to traffic ramp-by-ramp beginning August 28, 1990 and continuing through the end of the year.

In the fall of 1991, alongside the widening of Highway 410 into a full freeway, construction began on the connecting ramps between Highway 403 and Highway 410. These pass under the existing Highway 401 collector lane structures within the space vacated by the removal of the Highway 410 southbound to Highway 401 eastbound loop ramp. New overpasses were constructed for the Highway 401 express lanes.
The  link opened on November 2, 1992, at a cost of $7.3 million.

Extension 

The extension beyond Bovaird Drive to Hurontario was conceived as part of the ultimate plan for Highway 410 when it was under construction in 1982.
It would take until 2003 for construction to begin.
Planning for the  freeway began with the submitting of an Environmental Assessment by the Ministry of Transportation of Ontario (MTO) in October 1995. The assessment was approved without a hearing by the Minister of Environment and Energy on March 5, 1997.
The next several years were spent on engineering and design. The new section, planned and built as a four lane freeway, was constructed on a new alignment in order to bypass the Heart Lake Conservation Area. It was completed in phases: initially to the new eastward extension of Sandalwood Parkway, later to Mayfield Road and finally to Highway 10 north of Sandalwood.

Premier of Ontario Ernie Eves officially announced the extension on June 23, 2003; construction subsequently began on the first phase.
On May 15, 2006, construction began on the second phase between Sandalwood Parkway and Mayfield Drive. The first two phases were built by Dufferin Construction and opened together in mid–late 2007; the northbound lanes were opened by the beginning of September and the southbound lanes by the end of the month. Upon its opening, trucks were prohibited from driving along it due to concerns of them travelling on the two lane Mayfield Road; this ban has since been lifted.
Construction on the third phase between Mayfield Road and Highway 10 began in August 2007. The entire extension was completed and opened to traffic on November 16, 2009. Additional work continued in the months that followed to clean up the land surrounding the new freeway.

Recent work 
On September 9, 2014, the MTO announced that Highway 410 would be widened to ten lanes from south of Highway 401 to Queen Street in Brampton by 2018. A C$156.7 million contract was awarded to Aecon Construction to expand the freeway by adding one general purpose and one High-occupancy vehicle (HOV) lane in each direction. In addition, two new ramps will be built at the partial interchange with Highway 401 and Highway 403, a directional ramp from Highway 401 eastbound to Highway 403 southbound and a loop ramp from Highway 403 northbound to Highway 403 westbound, thereby providing access to and from all directions.
One new lane in each direction was opened in late 2017: a northbound lane between Courtney Park and south of Queen Street on October 31, and a southbound lane between Queen Street and Highway 401 on November 28.
In November 2018, both the southbound and northbound HOV Lane opened through the route.  The southbound HOV was opened several weeks ahead of the northbound HOV lane.

As a result of a study in 2018, the Courtneypark Drive partial-access interchange is being expanded into a full interchange as of 2020, with ramps being added to provide access to and from the section of Highway 410 north of that junction.

Exit list

References

External links 

 Video of Highway 410 from north to south
 Canada NewsWire Press Release
 Highway 410 Images @ AsphaltPlanet.ca

10
Roads in Brampton